Martín Ricardo Ligüera López (born 9 November 1980) is a Uruguayan football manager and former player who played as an attacking midfielder.

Club career
Born in Montevideo, Ligüera made his first division debut in 1997 for Uruguayan power Nacional. However it was his play with Fénix in which he scored 33 goals in 53 first division matches, which started to draw him interest from European clubs. While at Fénix his play helped convert the small Montevideo side into the revelation of the Uruguayan First division. They qualified for the 2003 Copa Libertadores, in which they had a famous 6-1 victory over Mexican side Cruz Azul with Ligüera tallying 3 goals.

Ligüera's contract was purchased by La Liga side Mallorca. His stay at the club was short-lived due to foreign player restrictions. Ligüera played one game in La Liga for Mallorca, against Sevilla FC, on 21 September 2003. He also scored in the Copa del Rey, and appeared in three UEFA Cup matches for Mallorca, starting in two of those matches. In January 2004, due to the arrival of Andrija Delibasic, he was loaned out to Grasshopper Club Zürich in order give the non-EU seat.

After the 2004 campaign, Ligüera returned to Uruguay and Nacional to help lead the club to a league title. His play once began to draw the interest of other South American clubs, resulting in stints with San Luis in Mexico and Peruvian powerhouse Alianza Lima. While at Alianza, Martin helped the club win a Peruvian League title and participated in the Copa Libertadores.

In 2009, he signed for Club Olimpia of Paraguay.

International career
A Uruguay full international, he also played at the 1999 FIFA World Youth Championship. He has represented his country 15 times and scored seven goals including a hat-trick on 15 August 2003 in a 5–2 victory over Iraq.

Career statistics

International

References

External links
 
 
 
 

1980 births
Living people
Uruguayan footballers
Uruguay under-20 international footballers
Uruguay international footballers
Club Alianza Lima footballers
San Luis F.C. players
Club Nacional de Football players
C.A. Cerro players
Defensor Sporting players
Centro Atlético Fénix players
Club Olimpia footballers
RCD Mallorca players
Chilean Primera División players
Unión Española footballers
Club Athletico Paranaense players
Joinville Esporte Clube players
Uruguayan expatriate footballers
Expatriate footballers in Brazil
Expatriate footballers in Chile
Expatriate footballers in Paraguay
Expatriate footballers in Peru
Uruguayan Primera División players
La Liga players
Peruvian Primera División players
Paraguayan Primera División players
Association football midfielders
Footballers from Montevideo
Uruguayan football managers
Club Nacional de Football managers